Beginning in the 1970 NFL season, the National Football League began scheduling a weekly regular season game on Monday night before a national television audience. From 1970–2005, the ABC television network carried these games, with the ESPN cable television network taking over beginning in September 2006. Listed below are games played from 1990 to 2009.

Stadiums and teams appearing under different names
Some stadiums and teams had multiple names throughout their appearances in the MNF package in this era. All names listed were seen in the package at least once in this era.

First name listed is the current (or final if it does not exist anymore) name for each team and stadium.

Stadiums
Bank of America Stadium – Ericsson Stadium
Candlestick Park – 3Com Park, Monster Park- Does not exist anymore
The Dome at America's Center – Trans World Dome, Edward Jones Dome - no longer an NFL stadium
TIAA Bank Field – Alltel Stadium, Jacksonville Municipal Stadium, Everbank Field
FedExField – Jack Kent Cooke Stadium
Nissan Stadium – Adelphia Coliseum, The Coliseum, LP Field
M&T Bank Stadium – PSINet Stadium
Mall of America Field – Hubert H. Humphrey Metrodome (technically, Mall of America Field only applies to the football playing field, making the full name Mall of America Field at the Hubert H. Humphrey Metrodome)-Does not exist anymore
RingCentral Coliseum – Oakland-Alameda County Coliseum, McAfee Coliseum, Network Associates Coliseum, O.co Coliseum - no longer an NFL stadium
SDCCU Stadium – Jack Murphy Stadium, Qualcomm Stadium - no longer an NFL stadium
Lumen Field – Seahawks Stadium, Qwest Field, CenturyLink Field
Highmark Stadium – Rich Stadium, Ralph Wilson Stadium, New Era Field, Bills Stadium
RCA Dome – Hoosier Dome-Does not exist anymore
Empower Field at Mile High – Invesco Field at Mile High, Sports Authority Field at Mile High, Broncos Stadium at Mile High
Hard Rock Stadium – Joe Robbie Stadium, Land Shark Stadium, Pro Player Stadium, Sun Life Stadium

Teams
Oakland Raiders – Los Angeles Raiders
St. Louis Rams – Los Angeles Rams
Tennessee Titans – Houston Oilers

1990s

1990 NFL season
The November 12 game between the Washington Redskins and the Philadelphia Eagles is known as the infamous Body Bag Game, in which Eagles head coach Buddy Ryan promised a beating so severe, that the Redskins would have to be "hauled off in body bags." The Redskins had the last laugh, however, as these two teams met in the same stadium on the same network in the Wild Card playoffs – the first ever such game aired on ABC. The Redskins won 20-6.

With the 1990 season, a new practice was established which featured the defending Super Bowl champions playing the first Monday Night game of the season. The practice was maintained through 2003 (except for 1994, 1995, and 2001). In the 1990 MNF opener, San Francisco took on New Orleans on September 10 roughly seven months after defeating Denver in Super Bowl XXIV in exactly the same stadium, the Superdome.

The December 31 game started at 8:00 PM EST rather than 9:00 PM EST to allow New Year's Rockin' Eve to air as normal. The Superdome became the first, and remains the only, stadium to host both the MNF opener and finale in the same season. Besides the Saints, the only other teams to have played in both the MNF opener and finale in the same season have been the 49ers in 1977, 1991, and 1994; the Chargers in 1981; the Cowboys in 1982, 1983, 1984, and 1995; and the Packers in 2008. However, at least one of the games played by each of those other teams was on the road.

Super Bowl XXV is best remembered for its signature play – Scott Norwood of the Buffalo Bills missed what would have been the game-winning field goal, as it sailed wide right.

1991 NFL season
The November 25 game was the last MNF game played in the Los Angeles area (until 2018), the last appearance for the Los Angeles Rams before moving to St. Louis in 1995, and the last MNF game played in Anaheim, California. The Rams dropped to 0-4 in home MNF games against the arch-rival San Francisco 49ers, with previous defeats coming in 1976, 1989, and 1990; they also lost a Thursday night home game to the 49ers in 1982.

The September 9 game between Washington and Dallas was the first Monday Night game for the Cowboys since the 1988 season, which was Tom Landry's final season.

1992 NFL season

Monday Night Football celebrated the 100th anniversary of nighttime football on September 28, 1992 with a game between the Los Angeles Raiders and the Kansas City Chiefs at Arrowhead Stadium.  The first recorded night football game was the 1892 Wyoming Seminary vs. Mansfield State Normal football game and ended at halftime with a 0-0 tie.

The season opener on September 7 featured the defending champion facing off against the current season's champion. In this case it was Washington (winner of Super Bowl XXVI) versus eventual Super Bowl XXVII winner Dallas.

1993 NFL season
The September 6 game marked the first time in 10 years that the Redskins hosted the Cowboys on MNF rather than visiting them. At the time, it was the most frequently seen match-up on the series, and it would be the last time these two teams played each other on MNF at RFK Stadium.

The September 13 game was the last win for the Cleveland Browns (who had won the very first MNF game in 1970) on the ABC program, and last win overall until 2008.

The October 18 game marked the first of nine meetings between the Raiders and Broncos on MNF over an 11-year span, seven of these games being played in Denver.

During the January 3 game, the Eagles missed a game-winning field goal as the overtime period expired, which would have left the game a tie. However, a penalty against the 49ers allowed a re-kick, and the Eagles were granted one untimed down. On the second attempt, the field goal was good and the deadlock was barely averted, preserving the fourth of what would eventually be seven consecutive tie-free seasons.

Both Wild Card playoff games featured a thrilling comeback victories by Green Bay and Kansas City after both being down 17-7 in the third quarter in their respective games.

1994 NFL season
ABC was unable to air the opener of the Dallas Cowboys, the previous season's Super Bowl champion, after the NFL guaranteed Fox it would have the Cowboys' game at Pittsburgh for its main doubleheader game. It was Fox's first Sunday of televising NFL games after gaining the NFC package from CBS.

In the September 5 game, San Francisco 49ers wide receiver Jerry Rice broke Jim Brown's touchdown record.

The first two-point conversion in MNF history came on September 12, when Chicago Bears quarterback Erik Kramer threw a pass to Curtis Conway.

The October 17 game between the Kansas City Chiefs and the Denver Broncos featured a quarterback matchup between Joe Montana and John Elway. Montana led the Chiefs to a 75-yard game-winning drive with 8 seconds left.

The October 31 game between the Green Bay Packers and the Chicago Bears was played in a driving rain with wind gusts up to 36 mph. Coincidentally, it also marked the 11th anniversary of the death of former Bears player, coach and owner George Halas. At halftime, the Bears retired the #51 jersey of legendary linebacker Dick Butkus. The game was played four hours after American Eagle Flight 4184, scheduled to land at Chicago's O'Hare International Airport, crashed into a field in Roselawn, Indiana, killing all 64 passengers and four crew members aboard.

The November 7 game between the New York Giants and the Dallas Cowboys included a fight between several players from both teams, including safety James Washington grabbing and swinging a cameraman's tripod.

The November 21 game was the first for Jeff Fisher as coach of the Houston Oilers. He would remain with the franchise through the end of the 2010 season, by which point they had become the Tennessee Titans. This was also the last MNF game for the Oilers before their move to Tennessee in 1997 and their name change to the Titans in 1999, and the last one in Houston until 2008.

The December 12 game would be re-matched later that month in the Wild Card playoffs in the same stadium, on the same network, and would be the last NFL appearance for Joe Montana.

The December 19 game between the Dallas Cowboys and New Orleans Saints was the first NFL start for Larry Allen, who replaced Erik Williams after he suffered season-ending injuries from an automobile accident. Allen provided a memorable play early in the game when Saints linebacker Darion Conner intercepted a Troy Aikman pass and looked to be on his way to a breakaway touchdown.  However, the 325-pound Allen surprisingly ran Conner down from behind short of the end zone. Larry Allen would play 14 seasons in the NFL and is enshrined in the Pro Football Hall of Fame.

The 49ers became the first, and remain the only, team to win the Super Bowl after losing the MNF season finale. Coincidentally, Super Bowl XXIX was also televised by ABC.

1995 NFL season
In the September 11 game, Packers quarterback Brett Favre threw a 99-yard touchdown pass to Robert Brooks. It was the eighth 99-yard touchdown pass in NFL history. The game also featured a death-defying leap when a fan caught a field goal after leaping off the side of the tunnel at Soldier Field.

In the October 9 game, Chiefs kick returner Tamarick Vanover returned a punt 86 yards for a touchdown to win the game for the Chiefs.

The November 13 game between the Browns and Steelers was played one week after Browns owner Art Modell announced that he would be moving the team to Baltimore for the 1996 season.

2 days after the November 20th game between the 49ers and the Dolphins, the world's first computer animated movie, Toy Story was released by Walt Disney Pictures and Pixar Animation Studios.

Some portions of the December 25 Cowboys-Cardinals game were used in the 1996 film, Jerry Maguire. In that game, Dallas' Emmitt Smith scored his 25th rushing touchdown of this season, an NFL record.

The December 30 Wild Card game between the Lions and Eagles was the highest-scoring playoff game in league history until it was surpassed by a 51-45 overtime win for the Arizona Cardinals over the Green Bay Packers on January 10, 2010.

1996 NFL season
Though the Oakland Raiders played two Monday Night games last season as well as one previous game this season, the November 4 matchup versus Denver marked the Raiders first home Monday Night game in Oakland since Monday December 7, 1981.

1997 NFL season
The September 22 game between the Steelers and the Jaguars (playing on Monday night for the first time in their short history) had one of the craziest endings in MNF history. The Jaguars were up 2 with almost no time left and Pittsburgh attempted a game-winning field goal. Jacksonville blocked it and Chris Hudson returned it the other way for a touchdown. During the return, Steelers head coach Bill Cowher cocked his fist back like he was going to throw a punch at Hudson when he was running down the Steelers sideline for the winning score. The extra point was finally kicked about 15 minutes after ABC signed off.

The October 27 game between the Bears and the Dolphins was rescheduled because Game 7 of the 1997 World Series, which featured the Florida Marlins, had to play at Pro Player Stadium on Sunday night, when the Dolphins originally were slated to host the Bears. Therefore, the game was moved to Monday night and was played simultaneously with the Packers-Patriots game (a rematch of Super Bowl XXXI, the only time MNF aired a rematch of a Super Bowl from the year before and the last Super Bowl rematch until the Broncos-Seahawks game in 2014). The Bears-Dolphins game, originally to be shown on Fox, was broadcast only in the Chicago and Miami areas as part of ABC's ''Monday Night Football.'' The rest of the country saw the previously scheduled game: a Super Bowl rematch between Green Bay and New England. After the conclusion of the Packer game, viewers were not taken to the conclusion of the close Bears win but instead went to local news. Because the Bears-Dolphins game was intended to be played Sunday on Fox (which aired Super Bowl XXXI, at the time the network's highest-rated program ever, and would have aired the Packers-Patriots game if it was played on Sunday afternoon as well), this marked a rare time in history where the Dolphins wore their white jerseys in a nighttime home game.

The November 10 game between the 49ers and the Eagles was the infamous game in which a fan had fired off a flare gun in Veterans Stadium, leading to the introduction of the court in the stadium.

The December 15 game between the 49ers and the Broncos is remembered for Jerry Rice's return from a torn ACL suffered in Week 1 against Tampa Bay, (however he suffer a cracked kneecap on a touchdown catch in the second quarter and missed the remainder of the season) and the jersey retirement ceremony for Joe Montana. The game is also well known for an incident where Broncos linebacker (and former 49er) Bill Romanowski spitting in the face of 49ers wide receiver J.J. Stokes.

1998 NFL season
This season was notable because it featured the Tampa Bay Buccaneers for the first time since 1983 when the team lost to the Green Bay Packers on December 12 of that year. The team played two Monday night games in 1998 losing to Detroit in Week 4 but beating Green Bay in Week 14. Ironically, the December 1983 game was the second and final Monday night game played at Tampa Stadium though ABC would air Super Bowl XXV played at the stadium. The December 7, 1998 game versus Green Bay was the first Monday night played at Raymond James Stadium and came just about 5 days shy of 15 years after the previous game hosted in Tampa.

The October 5th game between Minnesota and Green Bay proved to be the coming out moment for Wide Receiver Randy Moss. He caught 5 passes for 190 yards and 2 scores in the Minnesota victory.

1999 NFL season
The September 27 game between the San Francisco 49ers and the Arizona Cardinals is remembered for Aeneas Williams' knockdown of Steve Young that resulted in a career-ending concussion.

The October 25 game between the Atlanta Falcons and the Pittsburgh Steelers was the last Monday night game played at Three Rivers Stadium.

Two days after the November 22 game between the Oakland Raiders and the Denver Broncos, the world's first computer animated sequel, Toy Story 2 was released by Walt Disney Pictures and Pixar Animation Studios.

The AFC wild card game on January 8 is remembered for a lateral on a kickoff return that gave the Titans the win. It is called the Music City Miracle.

Super Bowl XXXIV came down to the final play – Kevin Dyson of the Titans was stopped just short of the end zone, preserving the victory for the Rams.

2000s

2000 NFL season
The September 4 game marked the first MNF appearance for the previous season's Super Bowl champion St. Louis Rams since moving from Los Angeles in 1995, and the first MNF game in St. Louis in fourteen years.

The week after that, the Jets hosted the Patriots – one full year before the September 11 attacks devastated New York City, among other places.

The September 25 game marked Colts quarterback Peyton Manning's debut in Monday Night Football.

The October 16 game was the first actual Monday night game in Nashville, making the Hank Williams Jr. opening theme even more appropriate as Nashville is a hotbed for country music, which Willams plays. This was also the first MNF game for the Titans since their move from Houston to Tennessee in 1997, at which time they were still known as the Oilers (they were renamed as the Titans in 1999).

The October 23 game between the Dolphins and the Jets featured "The Monday Night Miracle", when Vinny Testaverde led the Jets to 30 points in the fourth quarter to send the game to overtime. John Hall kicked the game-winning field goal, finishing the second-biggest comeback in NFL history.

In overtime of the November 6 game between the Vikings and the Packers, Packers wide receiver Antonio Freeman slipped on the wet grass, while Vikings cornerback Cris Dishman deflected the pass at the 20-yard line. The ball bounced off Freeman's shoulder, he rolled over, and it fell into his chest and right hand without touching the ground. While Dishman agonized over what he thought should have been an interception, Freeman stood up and ran for the end zone, scoring the game-winning touchdown. The play was replayed and allowed. Al Michaels was quoted as saying in reaction to the game-winning play: "He did WHAT?"

The December 4 game between the Chiefs and Patriots at New England was the first Monday Night Football telecast at an outdoor Northern stadium after Thanksgiving. Previously, late-season prime time games were reserved for stadiums in the South or West Coast, or domed stadiums. Cold weather prime time telecasts became routine in later years.

2001 NFL season
The September 17 game between the Minnesota Vikings and Baltimore Ravens (what would have been the Ravens' first appearance on MNF and the first Monday night game to take place in the city of Baltimore since 1978) was rescheduled to January 7 as the entire slate of week 2 games were postponed after the September 11 terrorist attacks at the World Trade Center and The Pentagon.

Coincidentally, the New York Giants played the Denver Broncos in the last game prior to the attacks, and that game was credited for saving lives since it ended after midnight in New York City.

The September 24 game was not only the first MNF game since the attacks, it was also a rematch of one of the most significant games in the program's history – 18 years before at Lambeau Field, the Redskins and Packers combined for 95 points, more than any other Monday night game before or since (the Packers won 48-47, on a last second Jan Stenerud field goal).

The October 1 game was the first Monday night game in the New York area since the attacks. A tribute to the rescue workers at the World Trade Center site was held before the game.

The October 29 game was the first Monday night game ever played at Heinz Field.

Denver Broncos kicker Jason Elam recorded the 20,000th point scored in MNF history when he kicked a field goal in the Broncos' 38-28 loss to the Oakland Raiders.

Due to Christmas Eve and New Year's Eve falling on Mondays in 2001, the NFL did not schedule games for those days. Instead, ABC aired Saturday night games on those weekends. The former weekend also had games on CBS and Fox that Saturday, marking one of the few times (until 2006) that three different over-the-air networks aired NFL games on the same day. In future seasons when Christmas Eve fell on a Monday, the matchup would feature two teams on the west coast.

2002 NFL season
During the October 14 game between the San Francisco 49ers and Seattle Seahawks, wide receiver Terrell Owens pulled out a Sharpie following a touchdown and autographed the football.

At halftime of the October 28 game between the New York Giants and the Philadelphia Eagles, the last of the fourteen clues from the television series Push, Nevada was revealed. By taking the appropriate letters (5th, 1st, 9th, 1st, 5th, 7th, 4th, 1st, 2nd, 7th, 5th, and 2nd) from twelve of those clues, the world "VONGEYELNAIL" was formed. Replacing the 5th, 6th, and 7th letters in the word would change it to "VONGILNAIL", translating it into the phone number 1 (866) 445-6245. The first person to call that number, Mark Nakamoto, won the grand prize of $1,045,000.  It was also the final Monday Night Football game played at Veterans Stadium

The November 11 game between the Oakland Raiders and the Denver Broncos marked the 500th Monday Night game. In commemoration, ABC used various themes and images of varied opens during commercial bumpers.

2003 NFL season
Under a new NFL policy, the NFL officially adopted a Thursday night game to open the season (something that was done for the first time the previous season), and no Monday night game in Week 17. The change was designed to maximize opportunities for scheduling between Week 17 and the opening week of the playoffs; in this way, no team could be disadvantaged by potentially having only four days between their final regular season game and a playoff game. Also, the ratings for the last game of the regular season were often low, and the game usually had no playoff meaning (the most likely reason for the scheduling move). To compensate for losing the opening night game (which was successful enough to be upgraded from cable to network television after only one year), ESPN got the Week 17 game that used to be on Monday Night, and aired it on Saturday.

The season saw two improbable comebacks occur. The Giants led their game with the Cowboys 32-29 with 10 seconds left. An out-of-bounds kickoff allowed Dallas to quickly get into field goal position and force overtime. Dallas' Billy Cundiff tied an NFL record with seven field goals as the Cowboys won 35-32. Three weeks later, Indianapolis trailed Tampa Bay 35-14 with 3:43 remaining. They scored three touchdowns in the closing minutes and won 38-35 in overtime after an unsportsmanlike "leaping" call negated a field goal miss by the Colts. Ironically, Simeon Rice, the player charged with "leaping", would later play for the Colts in 2007.

The Buccaneers-Eagles game was the very first regular season game at Lincoln Financial Field, the third straight year that MNF opened with a stadium's first ever regular season game (following Invesco Field in 2001 and Gillette Stadium in 2002).

The Packers—Bears game was the first played at newly-renovated Soldier Field in 20 months, since a divisional playoff game on January 19, 2002, when the Bears lost to the Eagles. The Bears played their 2002 season in Champaign, Illinois.

The Dolphins–Chargers game was played at Sun Devil Stadium in Tempe, Arizona because the Cedar Fire in California forced evacuees to Qualcomm Stadium. Ironically, this was supposed to be the homecoming for former Chargers linebacker Junior Seau, who was playing for Miami at the time.

All AFC West teams appeared on the program in a span of three weeks: the Chiefs played at the Raiders on October 20, the aforementioned Dolphins-Chargers game, and the Patriots-Broncos game on November 3. It was the first time since the realignment that MNF featured all of a division's teams in a 3-week span.

The Packers–Raiders game was played the day after the death of the father of quarterback Brett Favre. In an inspiring performance, Favre threw for 399 yards and four touchdowns in the Packers' rout.

2004 NFL season
The Eagles–Cowboys game drew controversy when ABC aired a risqué pregame skit featuring Eagles receiver Terrell Owens and Desperate Housewives actress Nicollette Sheridan. Owens caught three touchdowns in the game.

The Cincinnati Bengals played their first MNF game since 1992.

The Miami Dolphins pulled off a classic upset over the New England Patriots on December 20. Trailing 17-28 with 3:59 left, the Dolphins drove 68 yards to score on Sammy Morris' 1-yard run with 2:07 remaining, and then on a third down play, Tom Brady threw as he was being sacked by Jason Taylor. The ill-advised, off-balance pass sailed directly to linebacker Brendon Ayanbadejo, giving Miami a first down at the Patriots' 21 with 1:45 to go. Three plays later, A. J. Feeley threw for the game-winning score, a 21-yard pass to Derrius Thompson on fourth-and-10 with 1:23 left. The Dolphins wore orange jerseys for only the second time in team history.

2005 NFL season
This marked the final season for Monday Night Football on ABC. An impromptu doubleheader was scheduled on September 19 when the New Orleans Saints scheduled Sunday home opener with the New York Giants was rescheduled due to Hurricane Katrina's extensive damage to the Louisiana Superdome. The game was moved to the Giants' home field at Giants Stadium for Monday night with a special start time of 7:30 P.M. EDT, though the Giants were still the road team. (Usually, the only time the Giants are the road team in their own stadium is when they play the New York Jets.) ABC held a telethon to raise money for victims of the hurricane during the broadcast. At 9:00 P.M., ABC viewers outside New York and New Orleans moved to the Redskins-Cowboys game, while the Giants-Saints game aired on ESPN (the inverse was true for the New York and New Orleans markets). This could be considered the pilot episode of the ESPN series as well. When the Giants-Saints game was over, the New York and New Orleans markets were switched to the Redskins-Cowboys for the conclusion of that game.

The record for largest Monday night victory was tied and later broken during the season. The Seattle Seahawks 42-0 win over Philadelphia tied the record set in the Miami Dolphins' 45-3 victory over the New York Jets in 1986. Two weeks later, the Baltimore Ravens bested the margin in their win over the Green Bay Packers, crushing them 48-3. The Seattle win over Philadelphia was in the midst of a bad season for the Eagles and ended up leading to NBC getting flexible scheduling built into its Sunday Night Football schedules.

The Atlanta Falcons became the first team to win three home games on Monday night, beating the Eagles, Jets, and Saints. The final Monday Night Football game on ABC saw the New England Patriots beat the Jets 31-21; this was the same score the Jets were defeated by in the very first MNF telecast, when they played the Cleveland Browns.

ABC's final NFL broadcast, Super Bowl XL, was plagued by controversial calls made by officials.  The calls later reviewed by the NFL were all found to have merit; therefore not changing the outcome of the game. Had the Seahawks won, they would have been one of a handful of teams to beat both Pennsylvania-based NFL teams on ABC in the same season.

2006 NFL season
This marked the first season of Monday night games broadcast on ESPN. The season began with the first-ever scheduled Monday night doubleheader.  The Minnesota Vikings and the Washington Redskins had the honor of playing ESPN's first ever telecast with the Vikings winning the game in a defensive battle. San Diego shutout the Oakland Raiders in the night cap.

September 25 saw the New Orleans Saints return to the Louisiana Superdome for the first time since Hurricane Katrina. The game was preceded by musical performances by the Goo Goo Dolls, Green Day, and U2.

The October 23 game between the Giants and Cowboys became the highest-rated program in the history of cable television, being watched by over 16 million people.The December 25 match between the New York Jets and Miami Dolphins was the second game of the day as NBC aired a game between Dallas and Philadelphia. This marked the first time since 1997 both networks aired a game on the same day.

U.S. television ratings
Viewer numbers (based on average total viewers per episode) of Monday Night Football on ESPN. All times Eastern.With the exception of the September 11, 2006 Chargers–Raiders game, Monday Night Football was the most-watched program on cable until the premiere of High School Musical 2 which had 17 million viewers, breaking Monday Night Football's record of 16 million. The "It would have ranked..." column indicated what Monday Night Football would have ranked in the respective weekly viewer rankings, if it were ranked among the programs that aired on the main broadcast networks (ABC, CBS, NBC, Fox and The CW).

According to ESPN.com news services, ESPN's telecast of the New York Giants' 36-22 victory over the Dallas Cowboys on Monday, October 23, 2006 was viewed by the largest audience in cable history.

The game, featuring two of the NFL's biggest rivals, was seen in an average of 11,807,000 homes, based on a 12.8 rating. That translates to 16,028,000 viewers (a cable ratings point represents 923,000 households).

The previous record for cable television was the debate over the North American Free Trade Agreement (NAFTA) in November 1993, between then-vice president Al Gore and Ross Perot, [which aired on CNN's Larry King Live]."

We've never believed the acronyms NAFTA and MNF belonged in the same sentence, and we're thrilled to have established MNF as the home of cable's biggest audience ever, said Norby! Williamson, ESPN executive vice president for studio and remote production. "That fans have responded with the record is very rewarding and a vivid reminder of the power of Monday Night Football."

The nine most-watched programs ever on ESPN (as well as being 9 of the top 10 most-watched programs ever on cable, excluding breaking news) are:
 the aforementioned October 23 game between the New York Giants and the Dallas Cowboys (16.028 million viewers),
 the September 25 game between the Atlanta Falcons and the New Orleans Saints (14.9 million viewers),
 the October 16 game between the Chicago Bears and the Arizona Cardinals (14.23 million viewers),
 the December 16 game between the Cincinnati Bengals and the Indianapolis Colts (14.22 million viewers),
 the September 18 game between the Pittsburgh Steelers and the Jacksonville Jaguars (13.3 million viewers),
 the October 2 game between the Green Bay Packers and the Philadelphia Eagles (12.9 million viewers),
 the November 27 game between the Green Bay Packers and the Seattle Seahawks (12.7 million viewers),
 the first ever Monday Night Football game on ESPN – the September 11 game between the Minnesota Vikings and the Washington Redskins (12.6 million viewers).
 and, the October 9 game between the Baltimore Ravens and the Denver Broncos (12.5 million viewers), which attracted more viewers, during the television week of October 9–15, 2006, than NBC's Sunday Night Football Raiders–Broncos matchup on October 15, 2006.

2007 NFL season
The November 26 Miami Dolphins–Pittsburgh Steelers contest was the lowest-scoring game in Monday Night Football's 38-year history; it threatened to become the first scoreless NFL game since 1943 until just 17 seconds remaining, when Steelers kicker Jeff Reed booted a 24-yard field goal to win it, 3-0. Both offenses were stymied by a heavy thunderstorm which delayed kickoff for about twenty minutes; also, local high school football championship games the preceding weekend left the field in less-than-desirable shape. (The game also marked the return of Dolphins linebacker Joey Porter to Pittsburgh where he won a Super Bowl with the Steelers in 2005.)

The December 3 New England Patriots–Baltimore Ravens game finished with 17.5 million viewers, topping the debut of corporate sibling Disney Channel's premiere of the High School Musical 2 movie as the highest-rated cable television program of all-time.

The October 29 game marked the Packers' first win in Denver after losing their previous 7 games.
 

2008 NFL season
On September 8, Aaron Rodgers debuted as the starting quarterback for the Packers in their victory over the Vikings. It was the first game since September 20, 1992 in which Brett Favre was not the team's starter.

The September 15 game was the highest combined score in the 98 meetings between the Eagles and Cowboys, and the second-highest score in the first half of any MNF game. The game drew 18.6 million viewers, the most-watched MNF game on ESPN and the most-watched cable television broadcast in history. The game was also the last MNF game for Texas Stadium as the Cowboys would move into Cowboys Stadium the next season.

The December 1 game was the Texans' first MNF game in franchise history and the first MNF game in Houston since 1994.

The temperature at kickoff for the December 22 game was 2 degrees, making it the coldest game in the history of Monday Night Football and the coldest NFL game ever played in Chicago. Before 2000, Monday night games in December or January were played in the South, the West Coast, or domed stadiums to avoid extreme cold.

2009 NFL season
The September 28 game between the Carolina Panthers and the Dallas Cowboys was the first time Cowboys Stadium (now AT&T Stadium) hosted a Monday night game.

The next week featured the Minnesota Vikings hosting the Green Bay Packers marked the first time quarterback Brett Favre faced his former team. Favre completed 24 of his 31 pass attempts for 271 yards and 3 touchdowns and became the first quarterback in NFL history to defeat all 32 current franchises. On defense, Vikings defensive end Jared Allen had a career best 4.5 sacks. On the business front, the game scored an overnight metered 14.2 Nielsen rating including a 58.3 rating in Minneapolis and a 49.7 rating in Green Bay. In addition, the game averaged 21.8 million viewers which made the game the highest rated program in cable television history. In second place was Week 12's hyped matchup between the undefeated New Orleans Saints and New England Patriots which averaged 21.4 million viewers.

Team Standings (1990–2009)
The postseason games, though covered by the ABC Monday Night Football team, are excluded from the standings.

See also
Monday Night Football results (1970–1989)
Monday Night Football results (2010–present)
NBC Sunday Night Football results (2006–present)
Thursday Night Football results (2006–present)

References

 Total Football II,'', Edited by Bob Carroll, Michael Gershman, David Neft and John Thorn,  Harper Collins Publishing, 1999. .

National Football League lists
Monday Night Football
ABC Sports
National Football League on television results